Anak Putih Abu Abu (meaning High School Kids) is the second Indonesian-language studio album by Indonesian singer Anggun. The album was released in 1991 by Harpa Records and spawned hits singles "Nafas Cinta", "Anak Putih Abu Abu" and "Pesta Kita". Originally released in cassette format, the album was re-issued in 2015 by Bravo Musik in CD and digital downloads with four bonus tracks (including "Batu-Batu", a duet with Nike Ardilla). The album earned Anggun the Most Popular Indonesian Artist 1990–1991 award.

Track listing

References

1991 albums
Anggun albums
Indonesian-language albums